The issuing of work permits in Belgium is partially governed by the transposition of EU law, especially the principle of free movement of labour, and partially by Belgium-specific regulations.

There are three types of work permits for non-EU nationals: type C for students, relationship/family reasons and humanitarian reasons, type B for special categories of work (mostly in the context of training and posting of workers), and type A if you have repeatedly been granted a type B permit.

Requirements by nationality or status

Nationals of "old" EU Member States (EU-15 + accession 2004)
Nationals of Austria, Cyprus, Czech Republic, Denmark, Estonia, Finland, France, Germany, Greece, Hungary, Ireland, Italy, Latvia, Lithuania, Luxembourg, Malta, Netherlands, Poland, Portugal, Slovakia, Slovenia, Spain, Sweden and the United Kingdom are treated like Belgian workers, i.e. they do not need a work permit.

Nationals of "new" EU Member States (Accession 2007)
Nationals of Bulgaria and Romania still have to apply for work permits. These transitional restrictions to the Belgian labour market may apply for up to 7 years after the accession (= 1 January 2014). However, those nationals can profit from a fast-track procedure for work permits for professions for which it is officially recognised that labour is short.

EU long-term residents
Persons who have acquired long-term resident status in Belgium are treated like Belgian workers, i.e. they do not need a work permit.

Persons who have acquired long-term resident status in another EU country can profit from a fast-track procedure for work permits for professions for which it is officially recognised that labour is short.

Nationals of countries with which Belgium has special agreements
Nationals of successor states of former Yugoslavia (Bosnia-Herzegovina, Croatia, Kosovo, Macedonia, Montenegro and Serbia) and of certain Mediterranean countries (Algeria, Morocco, Tunisia and Turkey) may obtain a work permit type B even if they do not fall under the special categories mentioned there. They can also apply for a work permit type A one year earlier than nationals from other non-EU countries.

Work permit type C
Characteristics:
 Maximum validity period: one year
 Valid for all employers
 Valid for all paid occupations
 Granted to persons whose stay is temporary
The latter applies to
 a student (registered in an education institution in Belgium for full-time studies) who wants to work outside the school holidays, if this employment does not exceed twenty hours per week.
 a person living in cohabitation in the framework of a durable relationship with a partner of EEA nationality (European Economic Area i.e. EU-27 plus Iceland, Liechtenstein and Norway)
 According to the website diplomatie.belgium.be, this can only be a heterosexual or same-sex couple. The partners have to submit a declaration of statutory cohabitation.
 However, the website www.belgium.be states that you may as well live in cohabitation with a member of your family or any other person with whom you have a relationship without sexual connotation.
 the spouse or registered partner
 of an EEA national who is employed in Belgium since at least one year with an open-ended contract
 of special residence permit holders from the United States, Australia, Canada, New Zealand and Croatia
 of a diplomat or consul
 of a non-EEA national whose application for a residence permit (beyond work) or whose request for reconsideration of the decision to refuse the residence permit is being examined
 a non-EEA national's spouse or registered partner who has been granted the right of residence on the basis of Belgian family reunification law (Article 10 of the law of 15/12/1980)
 a non-EEA national's relative in the descending line who has been granted the right of residence on the basis of Belgian family reunification law (Article 10 of the law of 15/12/1980)
 the child (under 18) of a diplomat or consul
 the child of a non-EEA national whose application for a residence permit (beyond work) or whose request for reconsideration of the decision to refuse the residence permit is being examined
and further to
 an applicant for refugee status (asylum seeker)
 a beneficiary of subsidiary protection
 a recognised victim of trade in human beings
 a person authorised to a stay for medical reasons on the basis of Belgian law (Article 9ter of the law of 15/12/1980)
 a person whose prolongation of residence authorisation for humanitarian reasons is depending on employment
 a person staying in the framework of temporary protection

Work permit type B
Characteristics:
 Maximum validity period: one year
 Valid for only one employer
 Employer has to submit the application
For most non-EU nationals, a work permit type B is only granted for special categories of work (mostly in the context of training and posting of workers).

Special categories
 trainees (= interns, stagiaires)
 between 18 and 30 years old
 for a maximum traineeship duration of one year
 au pairs
 highly qualified workers
 who pay social contributions
 and whose yearly gross salary in 2010 was higher than 38'665 EUR (2013)
 highly qualified workers employed by interim agencies usually do not reach this threshold.
 managers
 who pay social contributions
 and whose yearly gross salary in 2010 was higher than 60'654 EUR (2011: 61'071 EUR)
 posted highly qualified workers
 posted managers
 researchers
 visiting professors
 specialised technicians posted to Belgium for a maximum of 6 months in order to install/initialise/repair an installation produced or delivered by their employer
 specialised technicians coming to Belgium for professional training
 workers posted to Belgium for professional training
 professional sportspersons
 at least 18 years old
 if their yearly gross salary is at least 69'400 EUR
 trainers
 if their yearly gross salary is at least 69'400 EUR

 posted foreign air carrier workers
 posted foreign tourist office workers
 stage artists
 employees who are nationals of Bulgaria, Romania, of successor states of former Yugoslavia (Bosnia-Herzegovina, Croatia, Kosovo, Macedonia, Montenegro and Serbia), of certain Mediterranean countries (Algeria, Morocco, Tunisia and Turkey) or of OECD countries (e.g. Australia, Canada, South Korea, the United States, Japan, New Zealand) coming for a professional training of more than 3 months at the Belgian site of their multinational employer established in another EEA country
 For a professional training of less than 3 months, nationals of the countries mentioned above could simply stay as tourists.
 employees who are non-EEA nationals coming for a professional training at the Belgian site of their multinational employer established outside the

Nationals of countries with which Belgium has special agreements
For persons who belong to none of the special categories mentioned above but are
 nationals of successor states of former Yugoslavia (Bosnia-Herzegovina, Croatia, Kosovo, Macedonia, Montenegro and Serbia) or
 nationals of certain Mediterranean countries (Algeria, Morocco, Tunisia and Turkey),
a work permit type B can also be granted if the employer demonstrates that it was impossible to find an appropriate worker on the Belgian labour market (i.e. EU nationals and long-term residents) within reasonable time. The competent Minister of the Region can grant exceptions for economic or social reasons "in individual cases worthy of consideration". If the application is successful, the employer receives an employment permit for that worker.
 However, few employers bother going to these lengths.
 Also, as immigration-related policies are very politicised in Belgium, the application is usually refused.

Fast-track procedure in case of labour shortage
The Belgian regions have compiled lists of professions in which labour is short, i.e. where they admit that it is difficult to find an appropriate worker on the Belgian labour market. This comprises professions like secretary, nurse and IT.
 Brussels-Capital region: 
 Flanders:  (VDAB)
 Wallonia:  (Le Forem)
 German-speaking community:  (ADG)

A fast-track procedure is in force in order to fill these vacancies with
 Nationals of Bulgaria and Romania ("new" EU Member States, accession 2007)
 List of fast-track procedure professions for Bulgarians and Romanians (undated)
 Persons who have acquired long-term resident status in another EU country

Work permit type A
Characteristics:
 Validity period: unlimited
 Valid for all employers
 Valid for all paid occupations
 Granted to persons who can prove a certain number of completed working years that are covered by a work permit type B, during an uninterrupted residence period of 10 years maximum
The requirements are:
 for nationals of countries that are bound to Belgium through international treaties or agreements on the employment of foreigners: 3 years
 This period is shortened to 2 years if the spouse or children of the foreign national are legally residing with him/her.
 for all others: 4 years
 This period is shortened to 3 years if the spouse or children of the foreign national are legally residing with him/her.
 for some categories, work permit type B is not taken into consideration when applying for work permit type A such as specialized technician, highly skilled worker, post doctoral...

References

Belgian labour law
Identity documents